Albuko is one of the woredas in the Amhara Region of Ethiopia. Part of the Debub Wollo Zone, Abuko is bordered on the south by Semien Shewa Zone, on the west by Were Ilu, on the north by Dessie Zuria, on the northeast by Kalu, and on the east by Oromia Zone.

Demographics
Based on the 2007 national census conducted by the Central Statistical Agency of Ethiopia (CSA), this woreda has a total population of 77,167, of whom 38,462 are men and 38,705 women; 3,465 or 4.49% are urban inhabitants. The majority of the inhabitants were Muslim, with 94.22% reporting that as their religion, while 5.69% of the population said they practiced Ethiopian Orthodox Christianity.

Notes

Districts of Amhara Region